Dub is an unincorporated community in Poinsett County, Arkansas, United States.

References

Unincorporated communities in Poinsett County, Arkansas
Unincorporated communities in Arkansas